Herbert Magnus Johnson (2 November 1879 – 20 October 1942) was an Australian rules footballer who played with Collingwood in the Victorian Football League (VFL).

Notes

External links 

Herb Johnson's profile at Collingwood Forever

1879 births
1942 deaths
Australian rules footballers from Victoria (Australia)
Collingwood Football Club players